Jillian Keiley is a theater director from St. John's, Newfoundland and Labrador. In 1995, Keiley became the founding artistic director of Artistic Fraud of Newfoundland. From 2012 to 2022, Keiley served as the artistic director for English Theatre at Canada's National Arts Centre.

Early life and education 

Keiley was born in 1970 and raised in Goulds, a small farming community just south of St. John's. She attended St. Kevin's High School, where her love of theatre was born. She enrolled at York University and completed the theatre directing program in 1994.

Career 
While attending York, she spent her summers back in St. John's where, under the tutelage of Lois Brown (then artistic animateur of Resource Centre for The Arts Theatre Company (RCAT)), she founded the Splash Cabaret Series. The series fostered her direct artistic collaborations with the up-and-coming members of the St. John's theatre community. Upon her graduation from York, she moved permanently back to St. John's and set about her first major production In Your Dreams, Freud (1994), in which she brought together a cast of 45, many of whom she had come to know and work with under the Splash banner. Freud was first mounted in St. John's as fundraiser for RCAT. It was such a hit that it was remounted three months later. Keiley and the production crew of the show founded Artistic Fraud of Newfoundland as a company to facilitate this remount. Keiley would go on to serve as Artistic Fraud of Newfoundland’s artistic director for 18 years.

Keiley's early work was marked by its size and its goals of mathematical precision. Her next piece following Freud was The Cheat (1996), a movement piece for 82 performers based on the music notation of Johann Sebastian Bach's Fugue in G Minor. In 1997, she created and premiered Under Wraps with Robert Chafe and Petrina Bromley.  Under Wraps was Keiley's first collaboration with Chafe and Bromley.

For Artistic Fraud, Keiley has directed The Cheat, Jesus Christ Superstar, Burial Practices, Under Wraps, Salvage: The Story of a House, Icycle, Oil and Water, In Your Dreams, Freud, Afterimage, Fear of Flight, The Colony of Unrequited Dreams and Between Breaths.

In 2002, Keiley directed Tempting Providence, Chafe's play which was commissioned and premiered by Theatre Newfoundland Labrador (TNL). The show was created for TNL's Gros Morne Theatre Festival, and it toured consistently from 2003–2014. During this period, Keiley was an annual instructor of chorus with the National Theatre School of Canada, and directed theatre and opera productions in Australia, Ireland, and across Canada.

Keiley succeeded Peter Hinton as the artistic director of the National Arts Centre English Theatre in 2012. For the NAC, she directed Metamorphoses, Alice Through the Looking-Glass (with Stratford Festival), Tartuffe (adapted by Andy Jones) and Twelfth Night (January 2016). After reducing the scope of her role for the 2021/22 season with the introduction of a co-curation company in residence, Keiley ended her tenure with the NAC in 2022. She was succeeded by Nina Lee Aquino.

For the Stratford Festival, she directed Alice through the Looking Glass (2014), The Diary of Anne Frank (2015), and As You Like It (2016), The Neverending Story (2019), and Richard II (2023, forthcoming).

Personal life
She is married to music producer Don Ellis, with whom she has one daughter.

Awards 
 Newfoundland and Labrador Arts Council's Emerging Artist Award - 1996
 Canada Council’s John Hirsch Prize - 1998
 Siminovitch Prize for Directing - 2004,
Betty Mitchell Award for Outstanding Direction (2006) 
 Memorial University of Newfoundland Honorary Doctorate of Letters - 2009

References

Canadian women dramatists and playwrights
Canadian theatre directors
Writers from St. John's, Newfoundland and Labrador
Living people
20th-century Canadian dramatists and playwrights
20th-century Canadian women writers
Canadian artistic directors
1970 births